Manuel Sevillano (born July 2, 1981 in Reus, Tarragona) is a male  volleyball player from Spain. Playing in different positions he was a member of the Men's National Team that claimed the gold medal at the 2007 European Championship in Moscow, Russia.

References
 FIVB Profile

1981 births
People from Reus
Living people
Spanish men's volleyball players
Sportspeople from the Province of Tarragona